The Danish Academy of Business and Technology (Danish: Erhvervsakademi Dania), usually referred to as Dania, is a business academy with eight campuses in Denmark. The academy is a state-funded institution subordinated to the Ministry of Higher Education and Science. Undergraduate applied degrees as well as preparation and qualification courses can be studied at the academy(short-term). There are 5000 part-time and full-time students and 175 employees.

Campuses 
Dania currently consists of eight campuses in Jutland; two of the eight campuses are international, located in Viborg and Randers. The campus located in Randers campus also the main campus, where the rectorate as well as most of the administrative staff are located. Other campuses are located in Grenaa, Silkeborg, Horsens, Hedensted, Skive and Hobro.

Programmes

Academy profession programmes (AP Degrees) 
Academy profession programmes  are undergraduate applied sciences programmes normally awarded after 120 ECTS-points, equalling the two first years of a bachelor's degree. The main subject areas taught at Dania Academy Denmark are IT, business, tourism, and automotive technology.

Bachelor top-up programmes 
Bachelor top-up programme duration is 1½ years and is for students who have already completed an AP degree programme or similar. 

By completing an AP degree programme and the top-up programme, students obtain to obtain a Bachelor's degree. 
 BA in International Hospitality Management 
 BA in Optometry 
BA in Data Analytics

Hybrid Degree programmes 
Hybrid Degree programmes combine online teaching with on-campus seminars. 

 Marketing Management (AP Degree)

References

External links 

Universities in Denmark